Joe Eldridge may refer to:

Joe Eldridge (cyclist) (born 1982), American cyclist
Joe Eldridge (musician) (1908–1952), American jazz saxophonist